There are a total of 41,205 Buddhist temples (Thai: Wat) in Thailand since last update. This is confirmed, of which 33,902 are in current use, according to the Office of National Buddhism. Of the 33,902 active temples, 31,890 are of the Maha Nikaya and 1,987 are of the Dhammayuttika Nikaya orders of the Theravada school, while 12 are of the Chinese Nikaya and 13 are of the Anam Nikaya orders of the Mahayana school. Two hundred and seventy-two temples, 217 of the Maha Nikaya order and 55 of the Dhammayut order, hold the status of royal temple. Royal wisungkhamasima, official recognition of a temple's legitimacy, has been granted to 20,281 temples. The following is a very partial list of Buddhist temples in Thailand:

By class

Royal temples

Special class
 Wat Phra Sri Rattana Satsadaram (Wat Phra Kaew), Bangkok

First class
 Wat Phra Chetuphon Vimolmangklaram (Wat Pho), Bangkok
 Wat Mahathat Yuwarajarangsarit, Bangkok
 Wat Suthat Thepwararam, Bangkok
 Wat Bowonniwet Vihara, Bangkok
 Wat Rajapradit Sathitmahasimaram, Bangkok
 Wat Rajabopit Sathitmahasimaram, Bangkok
 Wat Benjamabopit Dusitwanaram, Bangkok (built on the site of former: Wat Laem (วัดแหลม; Lem), also called Wat Sai Tong.)
 Wat Phra Si Mahathat, Bangkok
 Wat Arunratchawararam, Bangkok
 Wat Ratcha Orasaram, Bangkok
 Wat Sena Sanaram, Ayutthaya
 Wat Suwandararam, Ayutthaya
 Wat Niwet Thammaprawat, Ayutthaya
 Wat Phra Sorn Kaew, Phetchabun
 Wat Sri Suphan, Chiang Mai
 Wat Phra Phutthabat, Saraburi
 Wat Yanasangwararam, Chonburi
 Wat Phra That Phanom, Nakhon Phanom
 Wat Phra Singh, Chiang Mai
 Wat Phra That Hariphunchai, Lamphun
 Wat Phra Si Rattana Mahathat, Sukhothai
 Wat Phra Si Rattana Mahathat, Phitsanulok
 Wat Phra Pathom Chedi, Nakhon Pathom
 Wat Phra Mahathat, Nakhon Si Thammarat
 Wat Phra Borommathat Chaiya, Surat Thani

Second class
 Wat Chana Songkhram, Bangkok
 Wat Makutkasattriyaram, Bangkok
 Wat Ratchaburana, Bangkok
 Wat Rajadhivas Vihara, Bangkok
 Wat Boromniwat, Bangkok
 Wat Saket, Bangkok. On the grounds of the older, smaller Wat Sakae (วัดสะแก).
 Wat Somanas Vihara, Bangkok
 Wat Debsirindravas, Bangkok
 Wat Bophitphimuk, Bangkok
 Wat Chakkrawat Rachawat, Bangkok
 Wat Traimit Witthayaram, Bangkok
 Wat Kalayanamitr, Bangkok
 Wat Prayurawongsawat (Wat Prayoom or Wat Rua Lek), Bangkok
 Wat Molilokkayaram, Bangkok
 Wat Hong Rattanaram, Bangkok
 Wat Ratchasittharam, Bangkok
 Wat Phichayayatikaram, Bangkok
 Wat Anongkharam, Bangkok (founded as Wat Noi Kham Thaem)
 Wat Chaiyapruekmala, Bangkok
 Wat Suwannaram, Bangkok
 Wat Klang, Samut Prakan
 Wat Songtham, Samut Prakan
 Wat Phaichayon Phonlasep, Samut Prakan
 Wat Khemaphirataram, Nonthaburi
 Wat Chaloem Phra Kiat, Nonthaburi
 Wat Poramaiyikawat, Nonthaburi
 Wat Phanan Choeng, Ayutthaya
 Wat Sala Poon, Ayutthaya
 Wat Borommawong Itsarawararam, Ayutthaya
 Wat Chumphon Nikayaram, Ayutthaya
 Wat Chaiyo, Ang Thong
 Wat Pa Mok, Ang Thong
 Wat Phra Borommathat, Chainat
 Wat Phra That Choeng Chum, Sakon Nakhon
 Wat Phra That Doi Suthep, Chiang Mai
 Wat Sattanat Pariwat, Ratchaburi
 Wat Amphawan Chetiyaram, Samut Songkhram
 Wat Khongkharam, Phetchaburi
 Wat Maha Samanaram, Phetchaburi
 Wat Thammikaram, Prachuap Khiri Khan

Third class
 Wat Hua Lamphong, Bangkok
 Wat Nang Chi Chotikaram, Bangkok
 Wat Pathum Wanaram, Bangkok
 Wat Sam Phraya, Bangkok
 Wat Bang Phli Yai Nai, Samut Prakan
 Wat Phet Samut Worawihan, Samut Songkhram
 Wat Si Khom Kham, Phayao
 Wat Suan Dok, Chiang Mai
 Wat Tha Luang, Phichit

By region

Northern Thailand

Chiang Mai

 Wat Aranyawiwake
 Wat Buppharam, Chiang Mai
 Wat Chai Mongkhon
 Wat Chedi Liam
 Wat Chedi Luang วัดเจดีย์หลวง
 Wat Chet Yot วัดเจ็ยอด
 Wat Chiang Man
 Wat Chiang Yuen วัดเชียงยืน
 Wat Ket Karam วัดเกตการาม
 Wat Ku Tao วัดกู่เต้า
 Wat Lok Moli
 Wat Mahawan
 Wat Pa Dara Phirom วัดป่าดาราภิรมย์
 Wat Pa Daeng วัดป่าแดงมหาวิหาร
 Wat Phra Singh, Chiang Mai
 Wat Phra That Doi Suthep วัดพระธาตุดอยสุเทพ
 Wat Phra That Si Chom Thong
 Wat Saen Fang วัดแสนฝาง
 Wat Suan Dok วัดสวนดอก
 Wat Tadorn
 Wat Ton Kwaen
 Wat Umong

Chiang Rai
 Wat Pa Sak วัดป่าสัก
 Wat Phra That Doi Chom Thong
 Wat Phra Kaew
 Wat Phra Sing, Chiang Rai
 Wat Rong Khun

Lampang
 Wat Phra That Lampang Luang
 Wat Chedi Sao
 Wat Phra Kaeo Don Tao
 Wat Nakhot Luang 
 Wat Bunyawat 
 Wat Thung Kha 
 Wat Mon Pu Yak

Lamphun
 Wat Phra That Hariphunchai วัดพระธาตุหริภุญชัย

Nakhon Sawan
 Wat Koei Chai Nuea วัดเกยไชยเหนือ

Nan
 Wat Phumin
 Wat Phra That Chae Haeng วัดพระธาตุแช่แห้ง
 Wat Suan Tan วัดสวนตาล
 Wat Chang Kham วัดช้างค้ำวรวิหาร
 Wat Phaya Wat วัดพญาวัด
 Wat Nong Bua วัดหนองบัว

Nong Khai 
 Wat Pha Tak Suea

Phayao
 Wat Si Khom Kham วัดศรีโคมคำ

Phetchabun
 Wat Pha Sorn Kaew

Phichit
 Wat Tha Luang วัดท่าหลวง

Uthai Thani
 Wat Khao Wong วัดเขาวงพรหมจรรย์
 Wat Tham Khao Wong วัดถ้ำเขาวง

Uttaradit
 Wat Khung Taphao วัดคุ้งตะเภา

Northeastern Thailand

Khon Kaen
 Wat Nong Waeng (Phra Mahathat Kaen Nakhon)
 Wat Chetiyaphum (Phra That Kham Kaen)
 Wat Pa Thama Uthayan
 Wat Thung Setthi

Maha Sarakham
 Wat Photharam วัดโพธาราม

Nakhon Phanom
 Wat Phra That Phanom

Sakon Nakhon
 Wat Phra That Choeng Chum

Sisaket
 Wat Pa Maha Chedi Kaew

Ubon Ratchathani
 Wat Nong Pah Pong
 Wat Pah Nanachat

Udon Thani
 Wat Kham Chanot วัดคำชะโนด
 Wat Pa Ban Tat วัดป่าบ้านตาด
 Wat Pa Phu Kon
 Wat Phra Putthabaht Bua Bok (Phu Phra Bat Historical Park)

Western Thailand

Kanchanaburi
 Wat Thewasangkharam
 Tiger Temple
* Wat Thamfad

Central Thailand

Ayutthaya

 Wat Bang Nom Kho วัดบางนมโค
 Wat Chaiwatthanaram วัดไชยวัฒนาราม
 Wat Choeng Tha วัดเชิงท่า
 Wat Lokayasutharam
 Wat Mahathat วัดมหาธาตุ
 Wat Maheyong วัดมเหยงค์
 Wat Na Phra Men วัดหน้าพระเมรุ
 Wat Niwetthammaprawat วัดนิเวศน์ธรรมประวัติ
 Wat Phra Sri Sanphet วัดพระศรีสรรเพ็ชญ์
 Wat Phra Ram วัดพระราม
 Wat Phanan Choeng วัดพนัญเชิง
 Wat Phutthaisawan วัดพุทไธศวรรย์
 Wat Ratchaburana วัดราชบูรณะ
 Wat Suwan Dararam วัดสุวรรณดาราราม
 Wat Worachettharam วัดวรเชษฐาราม
 Wat Yai Chai Mongkhon วัดใหญ่ชัยมงคล
 Wihan Phra Mongkhon Bophit วิหารพระมงคลบพิตร
 Chedi Phra Sri Suriyotai เจดีย์พระศรีสุริโยทัย
 Chedi Phukhao Thong เจดีย์ภูเขาทอง

Bangkok

 Wat Amarinthraram
 Wat Anongkaram
 Wat Arun (วัดอรุณ; formerly: Wat Cheng)
 Wat Bang Khun Thian Nok
 Wat Benchamabophit (marble temple) 
 Wat Bopitpimukh
 Wat Boromniwat
 Wat Bowonniwet
 Wat Bowon Sathan Sutthawat
 Wat Bueng Thonglang
 Wat Chaichana Songkhram
 Wat Chaiyaprukmala
 Wat Chakkrawadrajawas
 Wat Champa
 Wat Chan Pradittharam
 Wat Chanasongkhram
 Wat Chinorasaram
 Wat Dusidaram วัดดุสิตาราม
 Wat Hongratanaram
 Wat Hua Lamphong วัดหัวลำโพง
 Wat Intharavihara
 Wat Kanlayanimitr วัดกัลยาณมิตร
 Wat Kanmatuyaram
 Wat Khanikaphon
 Wat Mahabut
 Wat Mahannapharam
 Wat Mahathat
 Wat Mangkon Kamalawat วัดมังกรกมลาวาส
 Wat Molilokkayaram
 Wat Mongkhutkasat
 Wat Nang Chi Chotikaram
 Wat Nuannoradit
 Wat Paknam Bhasicharoen วัดปากน้ำภาษีเจริญ
 Wat Pathum Khongkha
 Wat Pathum Wanaram
 Wat Phichayayatikaram
 Wat Pho (Wat Phrachetuphon)
 Wat Phra Kaew วัดพระแก้ว
 Wat Phra Srimahathat วัดพระศรีรัตนมหาธาตุ
 Wat Phraya Suren วัดพระยาสุเรนทร์
 Wat Pichaiyat วัดพิชยญาติการาม
 Wat Pradu Chimphli วัดประดู่ฉิมพลี
 Wat Prathoomkongkha วัดปทุมคงคา
 Wat Prayoonwongsawat วัดประยุรวงศาวาส
 Wat Rakhangkhositaram (early during the Bangkok Era: Wat Bang Va Jai (= Bang Wa Yai)
 Wat Ratchabopit วัดราชบพิธ
 Wat Ratchaburana (up to the second reign, Wat Lieb or Liab, วัดเลียบ)
 Wat Ratchanadda วัดราชนัดดา
 Wat Rajorasaram
 Wat Ratchapradit
 Wat Ratchasitaram
 Wat Ratchathiwat
 Wat Saket (Golden Mount temple)
 Wat Sam Phraya
 Wat Samian Nari
 Wat Sitaram
 Wat Sommanat
 Wat Suthat the Giant Swing
 Wat Suwannaram วัดสุวรรณาราม
 Wat Thammamongkhon วัดธรรมมงคล
 Wat Thepsirin
 Wat Thepthidaram
 Wat Traimit
 Wat Yannawa (วัดยานนาวา)

Lopburi
 Phra Prang Sam Yod
Wat Khao Wong Prachan วัดเขาวงพระจันทร์

Nakhon Nayok
 Wat Phrammani

Nakhon Pathom
 Wat Bang Phra วัดบางพระ
 Wat Phra Pathom Chedi วัดพระปฐมเจดีย์
 Wat Phra Prathon Chedi Wora Viharn วัดพระประโทณเจดีย์เจดีย์วรวิหาร
 Wat Klang Bang Kaeo
 Wat Rai Khing วัดไร่ขิง
 Wat Samphran วัดสามพราน
 Wat Srisathong
 Wat Song Thammakanlayani วัดทรงธรรมกัลยาณี
 Wat Suk Wararam วัดสุขวราราม

Nonthaburi
 Wat Bang Oi Chang
Wat Bang Phut Nok วัดบางพูดนอก
 Wat Chaloem Phra Kiat Worawihan
 Wat Chomphuwek
Wat Hong Thong (Wat Klang Na) วัดหงษ์ทอง
 Wat Klang Kret วัดกลางเกร็ด
Wat Ku วัดกู้
 Wat Paramaiyikawat
Wat Pho Ban Aoi วัดโพธิ์บ้านอ้อย
 Wat Prasat Nonthaburi
 Wat Sai Yai
 Wat Si Rattanaram (Wat Bang Phang) วัดศรีรัตนาราม (วัดบางพัง)

Pathum Thani
 Wat Phra Dhammakaya

Phitsanulok
 Wat Phra Sri Rattana Mahatat Woramahawihan
 Wat Chulamani
 Wat Nang Phaya
 Wat Ratchaburana
 Wat Chedi Yod Thong
 Wat Aranyik
 Wat Bunglam
 Wat Grung See Jayrin
 Wat Laemphrathat
 Wat Sam Ruen
 Wat See Bun Mayiga Ram

Samut Prakan
 Wat Bang Phli Yai Nai วัดบางพลีใหญ่ใน

Samut Songkhram
 Wat Bang Kung วัดบางกุ้ง
 Wat Phet Samut Worawihan วัดเพชรสมุทรวรวิหาร

Saraburi
 Wat Phra Phutthabat วัดพระพุทธบาท  
 Wat Tham Krabok วัดถ้ำกระบอก

Suphan Buri
 Wat Pa Lelai Worawihan

Eastern Thailand

Chachoengsao
 Wat Sothonwararam

Chonburi
 Wat Tan Lom
 Wat Utokkepasemaram

Trat
 Wat Buppharam (Wat Plai Khlong) วัดบุปผาราม (วัดปลายคลอง)

Southern Thailand

Nakhon Si Thammarat
 Wat Phra Mahathat
 Wat That Noi
 Wat Sema Muang
 Wat Thapho
 Wat Maheyong
 Wat Suan Khan
 Wat Manowwhan
 Wat Khao Khunpanom
 Wat Sala Meechai
 Wat Pisit Attaram
 Wat Chaichumphon

Phuket
 Wat Chalong
 Wat Phra Thong

Surat Thani
 Wat Phra Boromathat Chaiya
 Wat Phra Karn thakhanon

Ko Samui
 Wat Phra Yai (Big Buddha)
 Wat Khunaram (Temple of the Mummy Monk)
 Wat Lamai
 Wat Phra Raow Taow (Buddha's Footprint)
 Wat Khao Hua Juk (Buddha's Footprint)
 Wat Sumret
 Wat Plai Laem
 Wat Kiri Wongkaram
 Wat Sila Ngu ou Wat Ratcha Thammaram (temple rouge) 
 Wat Laem Sor

Krabi
 Wat Tham Suea (Tiger Cave Temple)
 Wat Kaew
 Wat Kaew Korawaram
 Wat Bang Riang
 Wat Klong Thom
 Wat Sai Thai

See also 
 Architecture of Thailand
 Thai temple art and architecture
 Buddhism in Thailand
 Knowing Buddha
 List of Buddhist temples
 Mahachulalongkornrajavidyalaya University
 Mahamakut Buddhist University
 Phutthamonthon, Buddhist park in Nakhon Pathom
 Sala Kan Parian
 Sanam Luang Dhamma Studies
 Sangha Supreme Council
 Supreme Patriarch of Thailand

References

External links

Buddhist monasteries in Thailand

Buddhist temples
Thailand
Buddhist temples in Southeast Asia